Calcium erythorbate is a food additive. Chemically, it is the calcium salt of erythorbic acid, with the chemical formula Ca(C6H7O6)2. As an antioxidant structurally related to vitamin C, it helps improve flavor stability and prevents the formation of carcinogenic nitrosamines.

References

Food antioxidants
Calcium compounds
Monosaccharides